Gas chamber may refer to a means of execution wherein a poisonous gas is introduced into a hermetically sealed chamber, to kill animals or humans.

Gas chamber may also refer to:

Compartments

Man-made
 A chamber used to maintain neutral buoyancy in life preservers and pontoons
 A recoil-reducing countermass mechanism in an automatic or semi-automatic rifle such as the AK-107

In nature
 The siphuncle or float chamber, found in the shells of some cephalopods
 Gas chambers, a fast, hollow and shallow point break type of wave

Geography
 Gas Chambers, a surfing beach near Aguadilla, Puerto Rico
 Gas Chambers, a surfing beach on North Shore (Oahu) where Gas chamber waves are found

Music
 Gas Chamber (album), a 1993 album by American rapper C-Bo
 "Gas Chamber", a song by the Angry Samoans on the 1982 album, Back from Samoa also covered by the Foo Fighters